Elsässer or Elsaesser or Elsasser means Alsatian in German. It may refer to:
 Gert Elsässer (born 1949), Austrian skeleton racer and gold medalist in 1982
 Hayley Elsaesser, Canadian fashion designer
 Martin Elsaesser (1884–1957), German architect and professor of architecture
 Thomas Elsaesser (1943–2019), German film historian
 Walter M. Elsasser (1904–1991), German-born American physicist
 Jürgen Elsässer (born 1957), German journalist
 Elsaesser (grape), another name for the wine grape Chasselas
 The Elsasser Bakery in South Omaha, Nebraska

See also
 Alsatian (disambiguation)
 The Alsatian dialect of German, which calls itself Elsässerditsch
 Der Elsässer Bote
 Elsäßerbach
 Images Alsaciennes/Elsässer Bilderbogen, published by Charles Spindler in 1893-6

German-language surnames
German toponymic surnames
Ethnonymic surnames